Dr. Siva is a 1975 Indian Tamil-language film, directed and produced by A. C. Tirulokchandar. The film stars Sivaji Ganesan, Manjula, V. K. Ramasamy and Major Sundarrajan. It was released on 2 November 1975.

Plot 
Dr. Siva is a well-to-do, well respected and a fun-loving doctor. He meets and falls in love with Geetha and they get married. However, trouble enters their life in form of Ammu who Siva sees as a sister with everyone else misunderstanding their relationship. Ammu dies under mysterious circumstances and the blame falls on him. Does he clear his name?

Cast 
Sivaji Ganesan as Dr. Siva
Manjula as Geetha
Major Sundarrajan as Lawyer
Pandari Bai as Lakshmi
M. R. R. Vasu as Varathan
V. K. Ramasamy as Paunraj
Nagesh as Babu
Manorama as Meenambal
Ganthimathi as Parvathi
Jayamalini as Amutha/Ammu
Typist Gopu as Lawyer
Pakoda Kadhar as Seenu
Premanand as Dr. Ananth

Soundtrack 
All the songs were composed by M. S. Viswanathan, and written by Vaali.

Reception 
Kanthan of Kalki appreciated the film for the cinematography, Tirulokchander's direction and writing, and Narayanan's dialogues. Manjula gained much notice due to appearing in glamorous, revealing clothes, contrary to the sisterly, conservative roles she played in previous films.

References

External links 
 

1970s Tamil-language films
1975 films
Films directed by A. C. Tirulokchandar
Films scored by M. S. Viswanathan